Enrique García (20 November 1912 – 23 August 1969) was an Argentine footballer. Nicknamed Chueco, or El Poeta de la Zurda ("the poet of the left leg", due to his skills for football), is regarded as the best Argentine left winger ever.

García had a long tenure in Racing Club de Avellaneda, where he played 234 matches in 9 years of career with the club, although the team did not win any title. Due to his extraordinary dribbling ability, García became an idol of Racing Club, being acclaimed even by his rivals. He also had a successful run in the Argentina national team, winning the Copa América on two occasions. Out of García's 78 goals scored in his career, only two were scored with his right leg.

Biography

García was born on 20 November 1912 in the city of Santa Fe. He started playing football at local Club Las Rosas. His brother Salvador played in the Unión de Santa Fe reserve team and brought him to the club for a try, but he was not chosen. In 1929 García  moved to Club Brown, where he debuted v Unión, scoring the only goal for a 1–0 win. In 1932, Gimnasia y Esgrima hired García (who was 19 yo) for m$n 2,500.

In Gimnasia, García won the Santa Fe regional championship, being part of a forward line nicknamed los pistoleros ("the gunmen") due to their high goal average. A journalist of El Litoral (local newspaper) nicknamed him "Chueco", which would be his most famous moniker. One year later, García was traded to Rosario Central for $5,000. The Rosarian team was still playing in regional tournaments, but García became an idol of the club and gained recognition not only in the city but in the whole country. García played near 100 matches with Rosario Central. It was said that Ernesto "Che" Guevara became a fan of Rosario Central after being impressed by García's style of play. Writer Osvaldo Bayer was also an admirer of García.

In spite of the interest from Independiente to bring García to the club, arch rival Racing was the club which signed García in 1936 for $39.000 and all the profits from a friendly match between both clubs. Apart from García, Racing hired Alejandro Scopelli and Enrique Guaita and goalkeeper Angel Capuano (all of them, returning from Italy). García made his debut for a porteño team in May 1936. He played 232 consecutive matches for Racing Club, being named "the poet of the left leg" by the press. His best season was in 1938, when he scored 20 goals in 32 matches.

In September 1943 García's left received a serious meniscus injury in a match v Boca Juniors, and underwent surgery. He never recovered completely causing that two years later García left football. He had played 234 matches with 78 goals scored for Racing Club.

National team 
García played 35 times for Argentina between 1935 (when he was playing for Rosario Central) and 1943, scoring 9 goals. He was part of the Copa América winning squads of 1937 (where he was one of the keyplayers of the team due to his goals and assistances) and 1941, he also played in the 1942 edition of the tournament. Unfortunately the peak of his career coincided with World War II denying him the chance to play in a FIFA World Cup.

Post-football career 

When his professional career ended, García worked at his own sweet shop until 1960, when he returned to football as talent scout and trainer of the youth divisions at Racing Club. "We do not whish to form players from a day to another so footballers can't escape from the human law of evolution", said García by then.

During his last years, García was in a situation of poverty and used to go from bar to bar, saying to customers "I am Enrique García, the best left winger of all times, would you invite me to have a coffee?"

García died on August 23, 1969. He was only 56 years old.

Quotes

In his own words

People about García

Honours
Argentina 
 Copa América: 1937, 1941

References

1912 births
1969 deaths
Footballers from Santa Fe, Argentina
Argentine footballers
Argentina international footballers
Association football wingers
Rosario Central footballers
Racing Club de Avellaneda footballers
Copa América-winning players